Presidential elections were held in South Korea on 15 October 1963. They were the first elections since the 1961 May Coup, and the first during the Third Republic. The result was a narrow victory for the acting incumbent and leader of the governing military Supreme Council for National Reconstruction, Park Chung Hee, who won 46.6% of the vote, securing a transition to civilian rule under his Democratic Republican Party. Voter turnout was 85.0%.

The elections were marked by a number of irregularities.

Background 
General Park Chung-hee, who had led the military government of South Korea since his coup in 1961, agreed to return the power to civil politicians on 8 April 1963, at the same time as announcing he would run for the presidency of the new civilian government. This was after he announced his plans to extend the military rule for another four years, to which United States reacted by threatening to cease all economic aid.

Nominations

Military
The military formed the Democratic Republican Party in February, and Park Chung-hee, who had officially retired from military service the day before, accepted DRP nomination for president in October.

On 3 September, members of the military that were critical of Park's dictatorial behaviour split and formed the Liberal Democratic Party (LDP), nominating former Chief of Staff of the Army and former interim prime minister Song Yo-chan for president. Members of the party were oppressed by the government for doing this. Song later withdrew and endorsed Yun Posun.

Civilian
Civilian politicians were deeply divided into multiple parties rather than unifying against Park. On 14 May, Former President Yun Posun and his followers founded the Civil Rule Party (CRP), which nominated Yun as its presidential candidate. Also claiming to represent the civilian politicians was the New Politics Party (NPP), which nominated former Prime Minister Heo Jeong as its candidate.

When it became clear that Park would win easily if both candidates ran, Yun suggested that the civilians unite under one party, which the NPP agreed to. The People's Party (PP) was officially founded in September, uniting the CRP, NPP and Democratic Friendship Party of former Prime Minister Lee Beom-seok. However, after failing to reach an agreement on whether to nominate Yun or Heo for president, on 13 September, the Civil Rule Party split from the PP and officially re-nominated Yun for president. The factions of Heo and Lee, which remained in the PP, nominated Heo.

On 2 October, Heo withdrew his bid for presidency and endorsed Yun, hoping to help defeat Park.

Results

By province

References

South Korea
President
Presidential elections in South Korea